Chalybs is a Neotropical genus of butterflies in the family Lycaenidae.

Species
Chalybs janias (Cramer, [1779]) Mexico to Venezuela, Colombia, Surinam, French Guiana
Chalybs chloris (Hewitson, 1877) Brazil
Chalybs hassan (Stoll, [1790]) Mexico, Brazil, Colombia, Surinam, French Guiana
Chalybs lineata (Lathy, 1936) Ecuador

References

External links
 Images representing  Chalybs, Consortium for the Barcode of Life

Eumaeini
Lycaenidae of South America
Taxa named by Jacob Hübner
Lycaenidae genera